Charles Frederick Gatehouse (September 12, 1877 – September 4, 1924) was an American college football coach. He served as the head football coach at the University of Utah in 1899, compiling a record of 2–1. He had previously been a student at Utah in the 1890s.

Head coaching record

References

External links
 

1877 births
1924 deaths
Utah Utes football coaches
University of Utah alumni
Sportspeople from Salt Lake City
Players of American football from Salt Lake City